Jagat Joity Das (April 26, 1949 – November 16, 1971) was a martyr of the Bangladesh Liberation War. He was posthumously awarded the Bir Bikrom, the third highest award for gallantry, for his role in the freedom movement of Bangladesh.

Early life and education 
Das was born in Jalsukha village Ajmiriganj, Habiganj District, Bangladesh in 1959. His father was Jitendra Das. Jagot Joity joined into movement against the Ayub Khan junta while still in school. In 1968, he passed his examinations and entered Sunamganj College, where he was  an active member of the Menon Group student union. In 1969, Das went to Guwahati, India, where he entered Nampong College and learned about guerrilla warfare.

Bangladesh war of liberation  
He received training in Meghalaya and joined the guerrilla group of Mukti Bahini afterwards, which operated primarily in the Sunamganj Netrokona Habiganj river,or 'Haor''', area. His group was known to the local people as Das Party. According to Abdul Kaium, one fellow commander of Das, the name of "Das party" was officially approved by the Bangladesh Liberation Army.

Das operated a number of guerrilla missions, such as the Paharpur operation, the Baniachong police station attack, and the Badalpur operation, driving out the Pakistani military from the region. Given the Pakistani Army's use of waterways as supply routes, the Das and other members of the group launched an assault on he Pakistani forces on October 16, 1971, cutting the military's supply lines. A bounty was subsequently placed on Das' head.

 Death 
On November 16, 1971, the Das party was attacked by the Pakistani army and was forced into retreat. Das got cornered and was shot dead in the assault. Pakistan army and local Rajakars retrieved his dead body near the bank of a river and hanged his lifeless body with an electric pillar of the local Ajmiriganj bazar.

 Memoirs 
In 1972, he was awarded with the Bir Bikrom, the highest gallantry award by Bangladesh Betar as the first civilian freedom fighter. However, the Bangladeshi government did not award him the medal until two decades later.

Communist activist and novelist Anjali Lahiri wrote a novel named Jagatjoity'', which was published in 2003 in Dhaka. Notable theater personality of Bangladesh, Smt. Ruma Modok, also staged a drama in his memory.

References 

1949 births
1971 deaths
Recipients of the Bir Bikrom
People killed in the Bangladesh Liberation War
People from Ajmiriganj Upazila
Mukti Bahini personnel